Harold is a structure used in longform improvisational theatre that is performed by improv troupes and teams across the world. In the Harold structure, characters and themes are introduced and then recur in a series of connected scenes. It was first performed in California by The Committee in 1967.

History 
The Committee, a San Francisco improv group, performed the first Harold in Concord, California, in 1967. They were invited to a high school and decided to do their improvisations on the war in Vietnam. On the way home in a Volkswagen bus, they were discussing the performance, when one of them asked what they should call it. Allaudin (Bill) Mathieu, (W.A. Mathieu)  called out "Harold", which was a joking reference to a line from A Hard Day's Night where a reporter asks George Harrison what he calls his haircut and he answers "Arthur". The form was further developed by improv teachers Del Close and Charna Halpern, as well as the Upright Citizens Brigade.

When The Committee disbanded in 1972, improv company Improvisation, Inc. was the only company in America continuing to perform the group's "original" Harold: a 45-minute free-form piece that would seamlessly move from one "Harold technique" to another. In 1974, in Los Angeles, former Committee member Gary Austin co-founded The Groundlings, using improv-as-a-tool. In 1976, two former Improvisation, Inc. performers, Michael Bossier and John Elk, formed Spaghetti Jam, performing in San Francisco's Old Spaghetti Factory through 1983. Spaghetti Jam performed Harolds while also turning Spolin games and Harold techniques into stand-alone performance pieces (i.e., shortform improv).

The 1994 book Truth in Comedy describes a "training wheels Harold" as three acts (or "beats"), each with three scenes and a group segment. With each beat, the three scenes return. By the end of the piece, the three scenes have converged.

Modified Harolds
Some modern improv forms are Harolds with an added requirement. These include:

 Monoscene – Originally and occasionally still Harold set in one location. 
 Sybil – Harold performed by a solo performer.
 The Bat – Harold performed in the dark.
 The Armando - A Harold performed with a guest monologist telling true stories

References

Theatrical genres
Improvisational theatre
1960s introductions
1960s in comedy